The El Dorado Plantation is a Southern plantation with a historic house located in Livonia, Louisiana, USA. It was designed in the Greek Revival architectural style. It has been listed on the National Register of Historic Places since March 24, 1982.

References

Plantations in Louisiana
Greek Revival houses in Louisiana
Houses in Pointe Coupee Parish, Louisiana
Houses on the National Register of Historic Places in Louisiana
National Register of Historic Places in Pointe Coupee Parish, Louisiana